Hafnersee is a small natural lake (0.159397 km²) of Carinthia, Austria.

Lakes of Carinthia (state)